The Baptist Union of Southern Africa is a Baptist Christian denomination in South Africa. It is affiliated with the Baptist World Alliance and the Evangelical Alliance of South Africa. The headquarters is in Roodepoort   in Gauteng province

History
The Baptist Union of Southern Africa has its origins in the first Baptist churches in Salem, Eastern Cape and in Grahamstown founded in 1823 by William Miller, an English Baptist pastor. The first ordained Baptist preacher to travel to South Africa was William Davies, who was sent by the Baptist Missionary Society in England. He arrived in 1832 and ministered in Grahamstown for a short period. Work in Kariega, about 16 miles from Grahamstown, began in 1834. A German settlement around 1860 brought the first German Baptist work led by Carsten Langheim. A German pastor, Carl H. Gutsche, baptized J. D. Odendall, who founded the first Dutch-speaking Baptist church in South Africa in 1886. The Baptist Union was founded in 1877 by four English-speaking churches and one German-speaking church. The South African Baptist Missionary Society was formed in 1892. Black Baptist churches united to form the Bantu Baptist Church in 1927, under the auspices of the South African Baptist Missionary Society.

In 1951, the Baptist Union establishes the Baptist Theological College of Southern Africa in Randburg and the Cape Town Baptist Seminary in 1974 in Cape Town.
 
According to a denomination census released in 2020, it claimed 562 churches and 36,711 members.

Associations
The Baptist Union of Southern Africa comprises a number of associations. Each association is made up of a number of autonomous local churches which prescribe to Christian tenets of belief and Baptist distinctives and hold voluntary membership with an association.

Baptist Northern Association
Western Province Baptist Association
Baptist Association of the Northern Cape
Border Baptist Association
Eastern Province Baptist Association
Free State Baptist Association
Kwa-Zulu Natal Baptist Association

See also 

 Bible
 Born again
 Baptist beliefs
 Worship service (evangelicalism)
 Jesus Christ
 Believers' Church

References

External links
Official Website 	
Cape Town Baptist Seminary
Baptist Theological College of Southern Africa

Religious organisations based in South Africa
Religious organizations established in 1877
Baptist denominations in Africa
Baptist Christianity in South Africa
1877 establishments in the Cape Colony